Scooterman is a short British romantic film comedy of 2010 produced and directed by Kirsten Cavendish, starring Ed Stoppard and Georgina Rylance.

Outline
The film is set in Notting Hill and Pimlico. Gerald Jones (Ed Stoppard) is a struggling writer working on a difficult novel and meanwhile making a living as a “Scooterman”: he goes out on a scooter to drive people home in their own cars when they are drunk. Shortly before Christmas, Gerald meets and falls for Daisy (Georgina Rylance), one of his customers, but she is living with a controlling boyfriend who is a literary agent.

Production
The film was the first made by Charlotte Eagar and was well received at the Cannes Film Festival. It went on to win the audience-rated Best of the Fest award at Palm Springs and Los Angeles Comedy Festival (2010), and it opened the Santa Barbara Film Festival in 2011.

Cast
Ed Stoppard as Gerald Jones
Georgina Rylance as Daisy
Annabel Mullion as Serena
Daniel Pirrie as Barry
Victoria Aitken as Girl who licks Gerald 
Georgina Birrell as dinner guest 
William Cash, Jr. as dinner guest
Charlotte Eagar as grumpy academic 
Duncan Tinkler as Father Christmas
Octavia McKenzie as amorous elf

Notes

External links
Scooterman on IMDb
Scooterman on Vimeo

2010 films
English films
Films set in London
British romance films
2010s British films